Vaddemgunta is a village in Palnadu district of the Indian state of Andhra Pradesh. It is the headquarters of Bollapalle mandal in Narasaraopet revenue division.

Geography 

Vaddemgunta is situated to the south of the mandal headquarters, Bhattiprolu,

Governance 

Vaddemgunta gram panchayat is the local self-government of the village. It is divided into wards and each ward is represented by a ward member.

Education 

As per the school information report for the academic year 2018–19, the village has a total of 6 MPP schools.

From this village so many people working outside of India, few more students completed their Ph.D in prestigious Institutes and working as Lectures.

References 

Villages in Palnadu district